"Only One" is a song by British DJ Sigala and English DJ, record producer, singer, songwriter and remixer Digital Farm Animals. It was released as a digital download on 2 December 2016 via Ministry of Sound. The song was written by Bruce Fielder, Nicholas Gale and Andrew Bullimore.

Music video
A music video to accompany the release of "Only Love" was first released onto YouTube on 23 December 2016 at a total length of three minutes and fifty-nine seconds.

Track listing

Charts

Certifications

Release history

References

2016 singles
2016 songs
Sigala songs
Songs written by Sigala
Songs written by Digital Farm Animals
Songs written by Andrew Bullimore